In multilinear algebra, applying a map that is the tensor product of linear maps to a tensor is called a multilinear multiplication.

Abstract definition 

Since the tensor product of linear maps is itself a linear map, and because every tensor admits a tensor rank decomposition, the above expression extends linearly to all tensors. That is, for a general tensor , the multilinear multiplication is

It is standard to use the following shorthand notations in the literature for multilinear multiplications:andwhere  is the identity operator.

Definition in coordinates 
In computational multilinear algebra it is conventional to work in coordinates. The linear map  is then represented by the matrix . Likewise, with respect to the standard tensor product basis , the abstract tensoris represented by the multidimensional array  . Observe that 

It follows from the above choices of bases that the multilinear multiplication  becomes

Element-wise definition 
From the above expression, an element-wise definition of the multilinear multiplication is obtained. Indeed, since  is a multidimensional array, it may be expressed as where  are the coefficients. Then it follows from the above formulae that

where  is the Kronecker delta. Hence, if , then

Properties 
Let  be an order-d tensor over the tensor product of -vector spaces.  

Since a multilinear multiplication is the tensor product of linear maps, we have the following multilinearity property (in the construction of the map):

 

Multilinear multiplication is a linear map:  

It follows from the definition that the composition of two multilinear multiplications is also a multilinear multiplication:

Observe specifically that multilinear multiplications in different factors commute,

if

Computation 
The factor-k multilinear multiplication  can be computed in coordinates as follows. Observe first that

Next, since

In other words, the multilinear multiplication  can be computed as a sequence of d factor-k multilinear multiplications, which themselves can be implemented efficiently as classic matrix multiplications.

Applications 

Further reading 

Tensors
Multilinear algebra